Joaquin M. Fuster (born 1930) is a Spanish neuroscientist whose research has made fundamental contributions to the understanding of the neural structures underlying cognition and behavior.  His several books and hundreds of papers, particularly on memory and the prefrontal cortex, are widely cited.

Early career 
Born in Barcelona, he was son of Joaquín Fuster (psychiatra) and a daughter of Marquess of Carulla, and brother of the cardiologist Valentín Fuster.

Fuster earned an M.D. at the University of Barcelona in 1953, and in 1967 a Ph.D from the University of Granada. From 1962 until 1964 he was a visiting scientist at the Max Planck Institute for Psychiatry. He is currently Professor of Psychiatry and Biobehavioral Sciences at UCLA's Semel Institute for Neuroscience and Human Behavior, and a resident fellow of the American Academy of Arts and Sciences

Awards 
Among numerous awards, Fuster has received the 2006 Patricia Goldman-Rakic Prize for Outstanding Achievement in Cognitive Research and the 2000 Fyssen Foundation International Prize for research excellence.
In 2010 he delivered the Segerfalk Lecture, given annually by an "internationally outstanding scientist who has made major contributions within the area of Neuroscience".

See also
 Cognitive science

References

External links
 
 

1930 births
Living people
Spanish neuroscientists
American neuroscientists
20th-century Spanish scientists
21st-century Spanish scientists
20th-century American scientists
21st-century American scientists